Paul-André Crépeau,  (May 20, 1926 – July 6, 2011) was a Canadian legal academic who led the reforms of the Civil Code of Quebec and the Quebec Charter of Human Rights and Freedoms.

Born in Gravelbourg, Saskatchewan, he studied philosophy at the University of Ottawa. He received his legal education from the Université de Montréal. He attended University College, Oxford as a Rhodes Scholar in 1950. In 1955 he received a Doctor of Law from the University of Paris. From 1974 to 1984, he was the director of the Institute of Comparative Law at McGill University. In 1975, he founded the Quebec Research Centre of Private and Comparative Law, and served as its Director until 1996. The Centre was renamed the Paul-André Crépeau Centre for Private and Comparative Law in his honour in 2012.

Honours
 In 1980, he was made a Fellow of the Royal Society of Canada.
 In 1981, he was made an Officer of the Order of Canada.
 In 1989, he was awarded an Honorary Doctor of Laws from Dalhousie University.
 In 1992, he was promoted to Companion of the Order of Canada.
 In 1993, he was the first winner of the Canadian Bar Association's Ramon John Hnatyshyn Award for Law.
 In 2000, he was made an Officer of the National Order of Quebec.
 In 2001, he was awarded an Honorary doctorate from the Sorbonne.
 In 2002, he was awarded the Prix Léon-Gérin.
 In 2004, he was awarded the Medal of the Bar of Montreal.
 In 2008, he was awarded the Prix Georges-Émile-Lapalme.
 In 2008, he was awarded an honorary doctorate by the University of Saskatchewan.

References
 Prix Léon-Gérin citation 
 Paul-André Crépeau at The Canadian Encyclopedia
 

1926 births
2011 deaths
Alumni of University College, Oxford
Canadian Rhodes Scholars
Companions of the Order of Canada
Fellows of the Royal Society of Canada
Fransaskois people
Academic staff of the McGill University Faculty of Law
Officers of the National Order of Quebec
Université de Montréal alumni
University of Ottawa alumni
University of Paris alumni
People from Gravelbourg, Saskatchewan
Canadian King's Counsel
Canadian legal scholars
Canadian expatriates in France